"What Are Friends For?" is the first segment of the twenty-sixth episode (the second episode of the second season (1986–87)) of the television series The Twilight Zone. The segment follows a father and son who both have the same childhood imaginary friend.

Plot
Alex Mattingly and his young son Jeff move to a remote cabin in the woods following Alex's divorce. Jeff is lonely and unhappy because he has no one for companionship during the summer. Alex suggests he get an imaginary friend.

Jeff meets a boy named Mike, and the two become friends. Mike always plays whatever game Jeff wants, and produces various playthings for them, such as horses to play cowboys with. When Jeff asks Mike where these playthings come from, Mike becomes snippy and convinces Jeff to follow him into a makeshift fort in the woods, which collapses on them. Mike turns into a being of light and floats away, leaving Jeff to die, but Alex finds Jeff and digs him out.

Once school starts, Alex introduces Jeff to the three children of his department head, but Jeff keeps getting into fights with them when they do not play his way and wants to play with Mike instead. Mike lures Alex out into the woods and identifies himself as Alex's imaginary childhood friend, proving it by producing a yo-yo that Alex etched his name into. Mike says he has been waiting for a long time for Alex to come back and play with him. Realizing that playing with Mike is discouraging Jeff from making real friends, Alex tells Mike to not play with Jeff any more. Mike refuses, saying that if he doesn't have anyone to play with anymore he will have to sleep again.

During a barbecue, the department head's daughter Cindy calls Jeff a goober. Jeff shoves her and runs into the woods to find Mike. Mike tells Jeff that he was only pretending to be his friend and calls him names. Alex finds Jeff and tells him about the value of real friends. Alex lingers behind to thank Mike, who transforms into light form again. Alex asks Mike who he really is and Mike tells him that he is a being who has lived on Earth since it was first created. Alex and Mike reminisce about their friendship and say goodbye. Alex returns to the barbecue and sees Jeff playing with the other children, having apologized to Cindy.

References

External links
 

1986 American television episodes
The Twilight Zone (1985 TV series season 2) episodes

fr:À quoi servent les amis ?